The 1st constituency of Haute-Loire is a French legislative constituency in Haute-Loire.

Historic representation

Election results

2022 

 
 
 
 
|-
| colspan="8" bgcolor="#E9E9E9"|
|-

2017

2012

References

External links 

1